The Pearl GTL is a gas to liquids (GTL) plant based in Ras Laffan, Qatar. It converts natural gas into liquid petroleum products.  It is the largest GTL plant in the world.  The first commercial shipment from the Pearl GTL was made on 13 June 2011. Pearl GTL received the 2021 "Asset of the Year" award by Shell.

Technical features
Upon achieving its full capacity within 2012, the Pearl GTL will convert  of natural gas into  of petroleum liquids and  into natural gas liquids and ethane. The integrated process automation and control system for the main plant and the onplot tank farm will be designed and implemented by Honeywell, while that for the offplot tank farm and the loading berths will be designed and implemented by Invensys. Page Europa was contracted as overall Telecom System Integrator for both onshore and offshore telecommunications systems. ABB Group was contracted to supply all of the electrical and control systems. The first train will be commissioned in 2010, followed by the second train in 2011.

The main contractors are KBR and JGC Corporation. Other contractors are J. Ray McDermott, CB&I, Consolidated Contractors Company, Kentz, Descon Engineering Limited.  The process pumps are supplied by Flowserve, chemical injection pumps are by LEWA Germany and eight turbomachinery trains for use in the air separation systems are supplied by Linde. Half of the 24 reactors for the Fischer–Tropsch process were supplied by MAN AG.

The Pearl GTL project builds upon the foundations of the smaller scale GTL project in Bintulu, Malaysia, which has been in operation since 1993.  The plant is expected to reach full production in mid-2012.

Cost
In 2003, the project cost was estimated to be US$5 billion. However, after facing huge cost escalation, it was reported to be $18 billion in 2007, and, according to QatarEnergy sources, final project cost is expected to reach as high as $24 billion.  Because Shell's contract provided them with the input gas for free, the project was calculated to be viable once the price of oil exceeded $40 per barrel.

Project company
The project is a Production Sharing Agreement (PSA) between QatarEnergy and Shell.

GTL fuel
The primary products of the Pearl GTL plant is naphtha and transport fuels, with paraffins and lubricant oils as smaller by-products of the process.  The transport fuel can be used in existing light and heavy diesel engines and has been shown to have a number of benefits, such as lower emissions and engine performance enhancement.

References

External links
 

Natural gas plants
Petroleum production
Energy infrastructure in Qatar
Natural gas in Qatar
Shell plc subsidiaries
Synthetic fuel facilities
JGC Corporation
Non-renewable resource companies established in 2011